Parliamentary elections were held in Uruguay on 19 April 1934, alongside a constitutional referendum. For the first time, the Senate was directly elected by voters. The result was a victory for the Batllista Colorado Party, which won a majority of seats in the Chamber of Deputies.

Results

Chamber of Deputies

Senate

References

Elections in Uruguay
Uruguay
Parliamentary
Uruguay
Election and referendum articles with incomplete results